Letters Home is the second album by The Soldiers. The album was released on 25 October 2010. According to Midweek Charts the album was set to enter at number 12 on the UK Albums Chart, although it eventually charted at #10.

Singles
 "Letters Home" was the first single released from the album, released on 15 October 2010. It is dedicated to Tony Downes – a guardsman killed whilst in active service.

Track listing
CD single
 I Will Carry You – 3:56
 Have I Told You Lately? – 3:43
 You're in My Heart – 4:01	
 Wonderful Tonight – 3:39	
 When A Man Loves A Woman – 3:39
 Yesterday – 3:02	
 Great British Hero – 4:42
 Your Song – 3:52	
 Everlasting Love – 3:17	
 You Are So Beautiful – 3:07	
 The Air That I Breathe – 4:00
 True – 4:04	
 Reqiuem for a Soldier – 3:42
 you raise me up – 3:51
 Missing You – 3:26	
 Every Time We Say Goodbye – 3:16
 Letters Home – 3:05

Chart performance
Letters Home entered the UK Albums Chart on 31 October 2010 at number 10, making it their second Top 10 album.

Weekly charts

Year-end charts

Certifications

Release history

References

2010 albums
The Soldiers albums